Revolt of the Beavers was a children's play put on by the Federal Theater Project by Oscar Saul and Louis Lantz. It was originally directed by Peter Hyun, but he was replaced when his actors refused to go Broadway with him, insisting on a name director. One critic described the play as "Marxism à la Mother Goose". The show ran at the Adelphi Theatre in New York City from May 20, 1937, to June 19 of that year. Jules Dassin and John Randolph were among the play's cast.
The play involved a worker beaver named Oakleaf, who leads a revolt against "The Chief" Beaver who was exploiting the workers. Though the play was a fantasy fable intended for children, it was attacked by the HUAC for promoting Communist ideals.

In October 2009, the play was re-written, adapted, and performed at the University of Wisconsin–Madison as part of the University Theatre's 2009–10 season.  The new adaptation was written and directed by John-Stuart Fauquet and Pete Rydberg and features an updated script, shortened production time, and smaller cast of characters.  In the 2009 version, the theme of environmentalism that was present in the original is highlighted even more in the story of two children who are transported to a mythical place called "Beaverland." They are forced to work endlessly by a cruel beaver chief while he sits back and reaps the benefits, which eventually leads them to revolt and establish a society where everything is shared equally.

Revolt of the Beavers is one of the plays that actor/director Tim Robbins featured in Cradle Will Rock, a 1999 film about the production of the play The Cradle Will Rock.

In 2015, New Orleans' Cripple Creek Theatre Company mounted a staged reading/performance of Revolt of the Beavers at Stein's Market & Deli for two performances on March 28 and 29.

In 2017, the Jim Henson Foundation awarded Joseph Therrien a Workshop Grant to create a new adaptation that included scenes from Hallie Flanagan's testimony before the House Un-American Activities Committee.  The first showing was on April 29, 2017 at The Brooklyn Folk Festival at St. Ann's Church.

In 2018, the acclaimed director, Shannon Twohy directed Revolt of the Beavers at Mixed Blood Theatre during the Minnesota Fringe Festival.

References

External links
  Article about the play, with photos from Life magazine
 Revolt of the Beavers script at George Mason University
 
 Activist Arts Part 2-A New Deal for the Arts

1937 plays
Children's theatre
Works Progress Administration in New York City
Federal Theatre Project